Gizo is a community settlement in central Israel, northwest of Beit Shemesh, under the jurisdiction of the Mateh Yehuda Regional Council.

History
The village was established in 1960 by the Jewish Agency as a place of residence for teachers of the Gizo Regional Council school, and was named after the nearby biblical city of Gizo (1 Chronicles 11:34). It is on the former lands of the depopulated Palestinian village of Bayt Jiz, whose name also possibly referred to Gizo.

References

Community settlements
Populated places established in 1960
Populated places in Jerusalem District
1960 establishments in Israel